There are two genera of snake named slender snake:
 Tachymenis
 Galvarinus

In addition, there is a species named slender snake:

 Galvarinus tarmensis